The 1960 World Sportscar Championship was the eighth FIA World Sportscar Championship. It was contested over a five race series commencing 31 January 1960 and ending 26 June 1960. 

The championship was won by Ferrari.

Championship summary
The 1000 km Buenos Aires returned to the calendar at the expense of the RAC Tourist Trophy, which formed part of the inaugural FIA GT Cup.

The championship still comprised five qualifying rounds. They were the 1000 km Buenos Aires the 12 Hours of Sebring, the Targa Florio, the Nürburgring 1000 km, with the 24 Hours of Le Mans being the final round.

With reigning champion, Aston Martin works cars not returning to defend their title, this left the door wide open for Scuderia Ferrari to reclaim the title. This wasn’t to be plain sailing as the nearest rivals turned out to be the smaller Porsches. The Italian manufacturer started stronger with Phil Hill and Cliff Allison taking the spoils in Argentina. Next was the annual trip to Florida, for the 12 Hours of Sebring, however the factory Ferrari and Porsche were not present because of the rule change by the FIA, allowing the organisers to permit use of only certain brands of fuel, As a result, the race was between privateers with works-backed drivers, with Porsche coming out on top. The mid-way point of the championship, saw the cars return to Europe for the Targa Florio. The twisty mountains roads of Sicily favoured the more agile car, like the Porsche which duly took the victory.

The championship then into moved into West Germany, the annual trip to the Nürburgring Nordschleife. To the surprise of everyone, the spoils went to an American team, Camoradi/USA Racing Team, whose Maserati was driven by Stirling Moss and Dan Gurney. This result meant, going into the final round, the only way Ferrari could stop Porsche winning the title was to win the 24 Hours of Le Mans, and that was exactly what they did.

Schedule

Points system
Championship points were awarded to manufacturers for the first six places in each race in the order of 8-6-4-3-2-1.
Manufacturers were awarded points only for their highest finishing car with no points awarded for positions filled by additional cars.
Only the best three results out of the five races could be retained by each manufacturer. 
Points earned but not counted towards the championship totals are listed within brackets in the table below.

Championship standings

† - Ferrari and Porsche finished equal first on net points but Ferrari was awarded the championship based on gross points scored.

The cars
The following models contributed to the net championship point scores of their respective manufacturers.

 Ferrari 250 TR 59/60 & Ferrari Dino 246 S
 Porsche 718 RS 60
 Maserati 300S & Maserati Tipo 61
 Aston Martin DBR1/300

References

External links
 1960 World Sportscar Championship points table 
 1960 World Sportscar Championship race results

 
World Sportscar Championship seasons
World